Jezeřany-Maršovice is a municipality and village in Znojmo District in the South Moravian Region of the Czech Republic. It has about 800 inhabitants.

History
Jezeřany-Maršovice was originally two separate villages with different history and owners. The first written mention of Jezeřany is from 1306, when it was owned by the monastery in Želiv. In the 16th century, it was property of the Strahov Monastery. Maršovice was first mentioned in 1356, when it was owned by the Rosa coeli convent in Dolní Kounice. Later the two villages urbanistically fused and now form one continuous village. The municipalities were merged in 1960.

References

Villages in Znojmo District